The Percy FitzPatrick Award, in recognition of author Sir Percy Fitzpatrick, was initiated in 1970 for the best South African children's book in English.

Initiated in 1970 by the South African Library Association (SALA), initially only books written and published in South Africa could qualify. Since most children's authors published with international publishers, there were few acceptable submissions in the early years. In 1977, it was decided to broaden the criteria to include books written by South Africans, or from a South African perspective.

In 1980, SALA became the South African Institute of Librarianship and Information Science (SAILIS), and its Committee for Children's Books became responsible for the awards until its disbandment in 1998. Since then, the awards have become the responsibility of the English Academy of South Africa.

In 2014 Kagiso Lesego Molope became the first Black author to win the award.

Winners

See also 

Olive Schreiner Prize
Sol Plaatje Prize for Translation
Thomas Pringle Award

References 

South African literary awards
Children's literary awards
Awards established in 1970
South African literary events